Dino Dini's Goal is a soccer video game released by Virgin Games in 1993. It is considered by many to be the "true" sequel to Kick Off 2 (in preference to Kick Off 3), as Kick Offs creator Dino Dini had moved from Anco Software and was responsible for all Goals engineering and game design. Goal introduced improved dynamics and A.I. over Kick Off 2, as well as other innovative features, such as multiple camera views. The game shipped 60,000 units on the first day of release.

Dino Dini's Soccer
Dino Dini's Soccer was a conversion of Goal! for the Sega Mega Drive. Dino Dini's Soccer had all the relevant features of the Amiga version and it was graphically superior to it. The game implemented an innovative 4-way play feature.

There was also a conversion to Super NES, developed by Eurocom. However, this version was only an interpretation of the game, and Dino was unhappy to have his name associated with it, as he was not responsible for any of that version and had no creative control over it. The SNES version features a very different control method, with the ball on sticking to your foot to make running with the ball easier. The game is viewed from above and played up and down the pitch, without the left-to-right option of Goal. Matches can be between 2 or 20 minutes, and the scanner which shows player positions on the rest of the pitch can be moved, resized or disabled. The method of triggering aftertouch onto a pass can be chosen as well.

The game features a variety of tournaments, including the full World Cup and its qualifying rounds, and the European Championships, or individual matches, as well as being able to configure a league or cup tournament to your own specification. Only international teams are included, although their names can be customised. Unlike most soccer games of the time, player ethnicities are accurately depicted.

Reception
Computer Gaming World in April 1994 said that Goal! "sound effects and animation are merely 'OK'". The magazine predicted that "Kick Off fans will definitely enjoy this one, as will many other soccer fans".

References

External links

1993 video games
Amiga games
Association football video games
Atari ST games
DOS games
Sega Genesis games
Super Nintendo Entertainment System games
Video games scored by Allister Brimble
Virgin Interactive games
Video games set in Europe
Multiplayer and single-player video games
Video games developed in the United Kingdom